Cachalote is a Brazilian offshore oil field. Cachalote was discovered in November 2002.  It has  of oil.  It was to return to production in 2010. Oil from this field is heavy, 20° gravity crude.

References

Oil fields of Brazil
Campos Basin
Petrobras oil and gas fields